Alexander Mejía Sabalza (born 11 July 1988) is a Colombian professional footballer who plays as a midfielder for Atlético Nacional. He is described by FIFA's official website as "a linchpin noted for his ability to tidy up mistakes, rob possession and track down and pressurise opponents".

Club career

Colombia
Mejía made his professional debut for Deportes Quindío in 2005, where he played for seven years, including a loan spell at Once Caldas. In 2012, he joined Atlético Nacional and won both the Copa Colombia and the Superliga Colombiana in his first season. In the following seasons, Mejía helped Nacional to three consecutive Colombian league titles, becoming team captain after the departure of Macnelly Torres.

Mexico
Mejía finished his loan at Nacional in June 2016. He was then transferred to León in the Liga MX for the Apertura 2016. However, as a part of the deal, he was able to stay with Nacional until after the Medellín club had finished its campaign in the Copa Libertadores.

International career
In 2012, Mejía made his debut for the Colombia national team in a FIFA World Cup qualifier against Peru. He went on to become a regular member of the squad in the remainder of the campaign, making five appearances overall.

2014 World Cup
On 9 June 2014, he was named in Colombia's squad for the 2014 FIFA World Cup, and played in four of the five matches Colombia had. On 14 June, Mejía appeared as a sixty-ninth-minute substitute in Colombia's opening match of the tournament, a 3–0 victory over Greece in Belo Horizonte, Minas Gerais, Brazil. Mejía also appeared in the following match against Ivory Coast on 19 June 2014, coming on as a substitute in the seventy-ninth minute, and seeing out a 2–1 victory in Brazil's capital, Brasília. In Colombia's third – and last – game of the Group Stage, they played against Japan. Mejía started at a defensive midfielder role alongside Fredy Guarín, playing the entire eighty-minute game. Colombia won 1–4. Mejía's last game of the 2014 World Cup came against Uruguay in the Round of 16 in the Maracanã Stadium, Rio de Janeiro on 28 June. Colombia won 2–0, and progressed to the Quarter-finals, playing against the hosts, Brazil, losing 2–1.

Season statistics

Honours

Club
Atlético Nacional

Categoría Primera A
Winner: 2013-I, 2013-II, 2014-I

Copa Colombia
Winner: 2012, 2013

Superliga Colombiana
Winner: 2012

Copa Libertadores
Winner: 2016

References

External links

1988 births
Living people
Sportspeople from Barranquilla
Colombian footballers
Colombia international footballers
2014 FIFA World Cup players
2015 Copa América players
Atlético Nacional footballers
Deportes Quindío footballers
Once Caldas footballers
C.F. Monterrey players
Club León footballers
Club Libertad footballers
Independiente Santa Fe footballers
Colombian expatriate footballers
Expatriate footballers in Mexico
Expatriate footballers in Paraguay
Categoría Primera A players
Liga MX players
Paraguayan Primera División players
Association football midfielders
Colombian people of African descent
21st-century Colombian people